R. Rajesh is an Indian politician of Communist Party of India (Marxist) and represents Mavelikkara constituency  of Kerala Legislative Assembly.

Personal life
Rajesh was born (15 April 1981) at Kollakadavu to A. T. Raghavan and Santha Raghavan at Kollakadavu in Alappuzha District. He holds a master's degree in science. Rajesh is married to Remya Remanan.

Political career
He was first elected to Kerala Legislative Assembly from Mavelikkara assembly constituency in 2011 Kerala assembly elections by defeating K.K. Shaju of J.S.S (UDF) by a margin of 5149 votes. He was re-elected for the second time in 2016 defeating Baiju Kalasala of Indian National Congress by a margin of 31542 votes.

References

Members of the Kerala Legislative Assembly
Communist Party of India (Marxist) politicians from Kerala
1981 births
Living people
People from Alappuzha district